Sydney Strickland Tully  (March 10, 1860 – July 18, 1911) was a Canadian painter. She is known for her pastel and oil portraits, landscapes and genre pictures, and for her success in a number of exhibitions. Tully kept a studio in Toronto from 1888 until her death. Her major works include The Twilight of Life (1894), an oil painting in the collection of the Art Gallery of Ontario.

Biography
Sydney Strickland Tully was born and raised in Toronto, the child of Maria Strickland and Kivas Tully. Maria Strickland was a niece of Susanna Moodie and Kivas Tully was a prominent architect.  Tully's sister, Louise Beresford Tully, was also a Toronto-based artist who operated a Yonge Street Arcade-based teaching studio  Tully's early studies took place at the Central Ontario School of Art (later OCAD University), Toronto, under Charlotte Schreiber and William Cruikshank (amongst others).  In 1884 she went to London to continue her education at the Slade School of Art, where she studied under Alphonse Legros.  Further studies took place in Paris at the Académie Julian (under Jean-Joseph Benjamin-Constant and Tony Robert-Fleury) and the Académie Colarossi (under Gustave-Claude-Etienne Courtois). Later studies took place at the Long Island Art School under William Merritt Chase.  Sydney Strickland Tully died on July 18, 1911 in Toronto, of pernicious anemia.

Career
Tully began her career colouring photographs and designing Christmas cards, and she worked with a variety of mediums including oil and pastel. She later became well known for her landscapes, genre-scenes and portraits. Tully kept a studio in Toronto (from 1888 to 1890), where she taught regular classes, and participated steadily in the artistic life of the city. She also travelled internationally to paint and to participate in exhibitions, including sojourns in London (1895), the Netherlands (1906–08) and the Jersey Channel Islands (1906–08). Tully wrote articles for The Globe (now known as The Globe and Mail) on European affairs, and she illustrated a children's book which was published after her death in 1911.

Legacy
Tully bequeathed her award-winning painting, The Twilight of Life, to the Art Gallery of Ontario.  It became the first painting by a Canadian artist acquired by the gallery (1911).  A second work, Evening on the Vaal, was acquired by the AGO by subscription in 1912.

Art market
In recent years Tully's work has appeared occasionally at auction, reaching modest prices.

Awards
For her painting The Twilight of Life, Tully won an honorable mention at the Pan-American Exposition in Buffalo and a bronze medal at the Canadian exhibition at the Louisiana Purchase Exposition in St. Louis, Missouri.  She was elected a member of the Ontario Society of Artists in 1889, and became an Associate of the Royal Canadian Academy of Arts the same year.

Major collections
Tully's work is in the collections of the Art Gallery of Ontario, National Gallery of Canada, and Museum London.

Major exhibitions
Tully exhibited regularly with the Ontario Society of Artists and the Royal Canadian Academy of Arts.  She participated in numerous other exhibitions, including the Art Association of Montreal (precursor to the Montreal Museum of Fine Arts), 1892–1909; the Toronto Industrial Exhibition (precursor to the Canadian National Exhibition, 1890–1910; the World's Columbian Exposition in Chicago; the Salon (Paris), 1888; and the Royal Academy of Arts, 1896–97.

Works
 The Twilight of Life, 1894
 Knalhaven, Dordrecht, 1907
 Washing Day, c.1910

References

Further reading

External links
 The Twilight of Life, 1894, The Art Gallery of Ontario 
 

Canadian women artists
Artists from Toronto
1860 births
1911 deaths
Académie Colarossi alumni
Canadian illustrators
Canadian women journalists
Journalists from Toronto
Académie Julian alumni
Alumni of the Slade School of Fine Art
OCAD University alumni
Members of the Royal Canadian Academy of Arts